Funny Women is an online and in-person workshop community dedicated to the support of female comedians. It was founded by Lynne Parker in 2002 as a reaction to misogynistic comments from a comedy promoter. Funny Women helps women find their voice, promote them, and assists charities.

During the 2019 Funny Women Awards Final, Funny Women announced that their new Patron (renamed “Matron”), would be Jo Brand.

Live events

Funny Women runs "Stand Up to Stand Out" comedy workshops hosted by Parker.

In 2013, Funny Women hosted the first Workshop Weekend at the women-only business club B.Hive in Covent Garden. This comprised two days of intensive comedy and confidence training, including a Stand-Up to Stand Out comedy workshop run by Lynne Parker, an improvisation workshop facilitated by Courtney Cornfield, writing for radio hosted by Paul Dodgson and character creation with Hattie Naylor.

Funny Women also hosts regular comedy showcases in London and Brighton; residencies include comedy venues at the Leicester Square Theatre and Komedia. Following a successful trial at the Richmond Literature Festival, Funny Women is now also branching out into literary festivals with a new format discussing writing female comedy with a panel of writers and performers.

Website

The Funny Women website contains a ‘magazine’ containing opinion pieces, podcast reviews & recommendations, live show critiques and actively encourages submissions from budding writers wanting to sharpen their comedy writing skills and get online presence for their work. They also offer feedback and help develop the writers of the future.

The Funny Women Awards

The Funny Women Awards were launched in 2003. Contestants include female talents such as Bridget Christie, Susan Calman, Katherine Ryan, Andi Osho, Kerry Godliman, Sara Pascoe, Zoe Lyons, Holly Walsh and Sarah Millican. 

The Awards have attracted national television and radio coverage (Richard & Judy, This Morning, The Culture Show), and national press (The Guardian, The Times, The Telegraph). The Awards have also been featured as a series of podcasts with The Sun (semi final, final), and footage from the 2007 final at the Comedy Store, London is featured on the Paramount Comedy website.

Due to the numbers entering, this competition has three stages. Heats take place over April, May and June and from these heats, 20 acts are selected. Four semi-finals are held in Brighton, Manchester, London and Edinburgh and from these, ten acts are selected to go through to the final. Previous venues include Leicester Square Theatre and Kings Place in London.

It was announced at the 2019 Funny Women Awards that Jo Brand would be the Patron of Funny Women.  The prize for the Stage Award 2019 would include mentoring from Brand.

2021

Stage Award 
 Lara Ricote (winner)
 Bronwyn Sweeney (runner-up)
 Ola Labib (runner-up)
 Abby Wambaugh	(finalist)
 Amelia Stubberfield (finalist)
 Beau Holland(finalist)
 Caitlin Powell(finalist)
 Louisa Keight	(finalist)
 Natalie Bellingham(finalist)
 Sharon Wanjohi (finalist)

Comedy Writing 
 Kathryn Bond 
 Sophie Duker

Comedy Shorts Award  
 Ada Player

Content Creator Award  
 Hayley Morris

2020  

 Izzy Askwith (winner) 
 Mary O’Connell (runner-up)
 Eryn Tett (runner-up)
 Naomi Cooper (finalist)
 Katie Green (finalist)
 Ania Magliano (finalist)
 Fiona Ridgewell (finalist)
 Christina O’Sullivan (finalist)
 Victoria Olsina (semi-finalist)
 Taran O’Sullivan (semi-finalist)
 Suchandrika Chakrabarti (semi-finalist)
 Olivia Flood-Wylie (semi-finalist)
 Kathy Maniura (semi-finalist)
 Karen Hobbs (semi-finalist)
 Gillian Fitzgerald (semi-finalist)
 Ambika Mod (semi-finalist)

2019

 Laura Smyth (winner)
 Sian Davies (runner-up)
 Charlie George (runner-up)
 Sarah Mann (finalist)
 Liz Guterbock (finalist)
 Helena Langdon (finalist)
 Kemah Bob (finalist)
 Shelf (finalist)
 Jen Ives (finalist)
 Celya AB (finalist)

2017–18

 Thanyia Moore (winner)
 Chloe Petts (runner-up)
 Susan Riddell (runner-up)
 Jodie Mitchell (finalist)
 Lily Phillips (finalist)
 Amy Mason (finalist)
 Louise Young (finalist)
 Megan Shandley (finalist)
 Maisie Adam (finalist)

2016
 Harriet Braine (winner)
Catherine Bohart (finalist)
 Rose Robinson (finalist)
Rosie Jones (finalist)
 Rivka Uttley (finalist)
 Micky Overman (finalist)

2015
Desiree Burch (winner)
 Helen Monks (runner-up) 
 Sarah Keyworth (runner-up)
 Christine Entwisle (Comedy Writing Award)
 Rachel Marwood (Comedy Shorts Award)
 Jane Postlethwaite (finalist)
 Julie-Anne Meaney (finalist)
 Kate Kennedy (finalist)
 Maggy Whitehouse (finalist) 
 Rosana Bosanac (finalist) 
 Sophie Duker (finalist) 
 Tamar Broadbent (finalist)

2014

 Jayde Adams (winner)

 Aine Gallagher (runner-up) 
 Lauren Pattison (runner-up)
 Heffernan & Fletcher (Comedy Writing Award)
 Sally Cancello (Comedy Shorts Award)
 Massive Dad (finalist)
 Samantha Baines (finalist)
 Robyn Perkins (finalist)
 Hawkeye & Windy (finalist) 
 Faye Daniels (finalist) 
 Pauline Shanahan (finalist) 
 Hannah Banana (finalist)

2013
 Twisted Loaf (winner)
 Katie Lane (runner-up) 
 Elf Lyons (runner-up)
 Reven & Fennell (Variety Award)
 Cassie Pope (Comedy Writing Award)
 Alex Maher for 'Hope And Gloria' (Best Show Award)
 Rachel Gleaves (finalist)
 Bisha Ali (finalist)
 Tevashnee (finalist) 
 Rachel Slater (finalist) 
 Bethan Roberts (finalist) 
 Becky Brunning (finalist)
 Sindhu Vee (finalist)
 Saskia Preston (finalist) 
 Dotty Winters (finalist)

2012
 Gabby Best (winner)
 Niamh Marron (runner-up)
 Katie Tracey (runner-up)
 Suzanna Kempner (Variety Award)
 Sarah Courtauld (Comedy Writing Award)
 Abi Tedder (finalist)
 Alice Frick (finalist)
 Amy Gledhill (finalist)
 Cerys Nelmes (finalist)
 General Advice Bureau (finalist)
 Lucy Frederick (finalist)
 Lucy Montague-Moffatt (finalist)
 Sofie Hagen (finalist)
 The Silky Pair (finalist)
 Viv Groskop (finalist)

2011
 Lara A King (winner)
 Katherine Bennett (Second)
 Bekka Bowling (Third)
 Ladies Live Longer - Louise Fitzgerald and Victoria Temple-Morris (Variety Award)
 Gabriella Burnel (finalist)
 Mel Moon (finalist)
 Sadia Azmat (finalist)
 Emily Lloyd-Saini (finalist)
 Vanessa Bland(finalist)
 Kerry Gilbert(finalist)
 Sarah Callaghan(finalist)
 Checkley & Bush(finalist)
 Janet Bettesworth (finalist)

2010
 Thankless Child - Liz Black and Freya Slipper (winner)
 Julia Clark (Second)
 Rachel Parris (Third)
 Gemma Whelan (Variety Award)
 Lindsay Jarman (finalist)
 Jess Fostekew (finalist)
 Clare Lomas (finalist)
 Sarah Hendrickx (finalist)
 Iona Dudley-Ward (finalist)
 Alison Thea-Skot (finalist)
 Abigoliah Schamaun (finalist)
 Helen Arney (finalist)

2009
 London Hughes as "Miss London" (winner)
 Eve Webster (Second)
 Jo Selby (Third)
 Charlie Covell (finalist)
 Tania Edwards (finalist)
 Giado Garofalo (finalist)
 Domestic Goddi (finalist)
 Rhona McKenzie (finalist)
 Elizabeth Mee (finalist)
 Catherine Semark (finalist)
 Marie Vagen (finalist)
 Katarina Vrana (finalist)

2008
 Katherine Ryan (winner)
 Sara Pascoe (runner-up)
 Rachel Stubbings (runner-up)
 Sarah Campbell (finalist)
 Pippa Evans as Loretta Maine (finalist)
 Rachel Fairburn (finalist)
 Girl and Dean (finalist)
 Rowena Haley (finalist)
 Gráinne Maguire (finalist)
 Elaine Malcolmson (finalist)

2007
 Andi Osho (winner)
 Joanne Lau (2nd place)
 Sharon Mannion (3rd place)
 Isma Almas (finalist)
 Emily Haworth Booth (finalist)
 Victoria Cook (finalist)
 Nat Luurtsema (finalist)
 Missman (Lisa Alabaksh) (finalist)
 Katie Mulgrew (finalist)
 Katy Schute (finalist)

2006
 Suzy Bennett (winner)
 Diane Morgan (2nd)
 Christina Martin (3rd)
 Susan Calman (finalist)
 Holly Walsh (finalist)
 Martine Pepper (finalist)
 Liz Carr (finalist)
 Maggie Gordon-Walker (finalist)
 Sonya Kelly (finalist)
 Rosie Wilby (finalist)

2005
 Debra Jane Appleby (winner)
 Sarah Millican (runner-up)
 Ruth Bratt (runner-up)
 Wendy Wason (finalist)
 Steph Baker (finalist)
 Julie Jepson (finalist)
 Jude Mahon (finalist)
 Emma Fryer (finalist)
 Becky Love (finalist)
 Helen Keen (finalist)

2004
 Zoe Lyons (winner)
 Anna Crilly (runner-up)
 Janice Phayre (runner-up)
 Bridget Christie (finalist)
 Roisin Conaty (finalist)
 Lindzi Germain (finalist)
 Susan Hanks (finalist)
 Sarah Ledger (finalist)
 Millie & Tillie (finalist)

2003
 Sarah Adams as Jade the Folk Singer (winner)
 Anna Keirle (runner-up)
 Ria Lina (runner-up)
 Kerry Godliman (Highly Commended)
 Karen Bayley (finalist)
 Jo Jo Sutherland (finalist)
 Katy Wix (finalist)
   Helen Kane (finalist)
 Debs Gatenby (finalist)
 Brandy Borr (finalist)

Charity
Funny Women works with organisations that represent aspects of women's wellbeing. It Women has raised awareness and over £70,000 for Refuge, Womankind Worldwide, Rise UK, The Victoria Foundation, Women's Aid, V-Day, ActionAid, Ovarian Cancer Action, the YWCA, Jo's Trust and the Bristol Cancer Help Centre.

See also

 List of media awards honoring women

References

External links
 

Mass media awards honoring women
British comedy and humour awards
English awards
Awards established in 2003